Tassadane Haddada District is a district of Mila Province, Algeria.

The district is further divided into 2 municipalities:
Tassadane Haddada
Minar Zarza

Districts of Mila Province